Range Beyond the Blue is a 1947 American Western film directed by Ray Taylor and written by Patricia Harper. The film stars Eddie Dean, Roscoe Ates,Helen Mowery, Bob Duncan, Ted Adams and Billy Hammond. The film was released on March 17, 1947, by Producers Releasing Corporation.

Plot
Outlaws are robbing a stage line, owned and operated by Margie Rodgers (Helen Mowery), whenever it carries gold. They aim to drive the value of the stage coach line down, then buy it cheaply through a front, and sell it for the true market price. Their plan is derailed by Eddie Dean and Soapy Jones (Roscoe Ates) who breakup one of the assaults. Eddie has Soapy take over the local sheriff's office when the sheriff is wounded. They battle the outlaw gang, and after some musical interludes, eventually break it up and expose the criminal plot.

Cast          
Eddie Dean as Eddie Dean
Roscoe Ates as Soapy Jones
Helen Mowery as Margie Rodgers
Bob Duncan as Lash Taggert
Ted Adams as Henry Rodgers
Billy Hammond as Kyle 
George Turner as Bragg
Ted French as Sneezer
Buster Slaven as Kirk Mason 
Steve Clark as Sheriff William Carter
M.H. Richman as Jug Player 
Freddie Daniel as Musician 
Eddie Wallace as Musician 
J.D. Sumner as Musician
Flash as Flash

References

External links
 

1947 films
American Western (genre) films
1947 Western (genre) films
Producers Releasing Corporation films
Films directed by Ray Taylor
American black-and-white films
1940s English-language films
1940s American films